Penelope Jane Allman-Payne (born 19 March 1970) is an Australian politician. She is a member of the Australian Greens and was elected to the Senate at the 2022 federal election, to a term beginning on 1 July 2022. She worked as a lawyer and schoolteacher before entering politics.

Early life
Allman-Payne is a qualified lawyer and practised in insurance law before taking up teaching as a profession. She worked as a secondary school teacher for over 25 years before being elected to parliament, and was an active member in the Queensland Teachers' Union.

Politics
Allman-Payne joined the Greens in 2010. She ran as the party's candidate for the Capalaba seat in the state election in 2012, losing to the LNP's Steve Davies. In the 2013 federal election she lost to Andrew Laming in the race for the federal seat of Bowman.

Allman-Payne was elected to the Senate at the 2022 federal election.

Personal life 
Allman-Payne is married and has two children, and has lived in Gladstone since 2018.

References

External links

1970 births
Living people
Australian Greens members of the Parliament of Australia
Members of the Australian Senate
Members of the Australian Senate for Queensland
Women members of the Australian Senate
People from Queensland
Politicians from Brisbane
Australian trade unionists
Australian schoolteachers
Schoolteachers from Queensland
21st-century Australian politicians
21st-century Australian women politicians